PwC Tower at Commercial Bay is a mixed-use office tower and retail development in Auckland, New Zealand, completed and officially opened in June 2020.

The PwC tower is the currently tallest building in New Zealand and the second tallest structure in Auckland behind the Sky Tower.

Project timeline and construction delays 
Construction on site began in mid-2016 with the demolition of the Downtown Shopping Centre. The retail development was originally scheduled to open in October 2018, followed by the office tower in June 2019.

Fletcher Construction, responsible for the overall construction of the development, posted massive financial losses in 2017 due to rising costs in construction. And as Fletcher Construction began to downsize its operational capabilities, the project was subsequently delayed due to numerous extension and additional cost claims to Precinct Properties, with the retail centre to be completed in March 2020 and the office tower to be completed in April 2020.

The building was officially topped out in June 2019.

The retail centre was originally scheduled to be officially opened on 28 March 2020, but just days before a nationwide coronavirus pandemic lockdown was announced and a new opening date was set for June 2020. On 11 June 2020, the development was officially opened by Prime Minister Jacinda Ardern.

Design 

The design brief for the Commercial Bay project team was to deliver an urban experience that reflects Auckland’s position in the world as a place of cultural richness, desirability, and relevance.

Architectural design 
Warren & Mahoney are the lead architectural designers, partnering with Woods Bagot and NH Architecture.

Philosophy 
The development was to represent the "maturation of Auckland as the 'Capital of the Pacific'", a destination for retail, food, entertainment, and commerce, a new symbol of the city's emergent confidence. The development concept was considered as a comprehensive, site wide precinct development (a "Retail Precinct", and "Tower Precinct").

Structural design 
Holmes Consulting, an industry-leading structural engineering consultancy firm provided the structural design and consultancy services to the entire development (for both the retail complex and the office tower).

Complexities

Accommodating the City Rail Link Tunnels under the PwC Tower 
One of the major design complexities of the development was to accommodate the new City Rail Link tunnels running underneath the basement of the office tower to the Britomart Train Station.

The main challenge when designing the basement came from the requirement that it needed to be stepped to accommodate the CRL tunnels. There are three levels on one side of the site and one level on the other, followed by the curved tunnels running through the middle of the site.

The alignment of the tunnels had been set before the design of the office tower, and it was decided that the best way to proceed was to build the foundations of the office tower into a cavern-like structure within the development. It meant the tunnels could be completely structurally isolated from the rest of the building.

There were water ingress issues to be considered as the bottom of the basement is well below sea level.

Due to the location of the tunnels, some of the tower columns are unable to reach the ground.

A "transfer gymnastics" was developed for loads to transfer across the top of the tunnels so that they don't upset the alignment. The columns were also unable to be supported by the tunnels as this would have risked vibration transmission therefore by integrating the tunnel alignments with the position of the tower and the basement ramp contributed to a very sophisticated design for the base portion of the tower.

Floor configurations 
All levels are configured as a side core floor plate design, where the central lift core shaft is removed from the center of the floor plates (as typical with all office buildings) to the external face of the building. This allows significant space gain of the entire floor, allowing tenants full flexibility on how to use  of their entire floor space.

Environmental 
The office tower is New Zealand's most sustainable high-rise office building and currently holds a 5 Star Green Building and Green Star Design Rating High-performance glazing was specified to include a ceramic frit below the low-E coating – a sophisticated process only available from two glass manufacturers globally at the time of construction.

Major tenants
The anchor tenant of the office tower is PricewaterhouseCoopers, with about 900 staff taking up to six floors. Other major tenants include Jarden, MinterEllisonRuddWatts, Chapman Tripp, DLA Piper.

See also 
List of tallest buildings in Auckland
List of tallest structures in New Zealand
Vero Centre

References 

Skyscrapers in Auckland
Office buildings completed in 2020
2020 establishments in New Zealand
Auckland CBD
Auckland waterfront